was a Japanese physicist. His research interests include chemical physics and statistical mechanics. In 2001, Kawasaki was awarded the Boltzmann Medal for "his contribution to our understanding of dynamic phenomena in condensed matter systems, in particular the mode-coupling theory of fluids near criticality, and nonlinear problems, such as critical phenomena in sheared fluids and phase separations".

Academic background
Kawasaki was born on 4 August 1930 in Ōtsu, Shiga, Japan. He received his B.Sc. (1953) and M.Sc. (1955) in physics from Kyushu University, followed by his Ph.D. in physics from Duke University in 1959. He has held a number of appointments in Japan and in the United States since then.
 JSPS Research Fellow at Kyushu University (1959–1960) and Kyoto University
(1960–1962)
 Instructor, Nagoya University, 1962–1963
 Research Associate, M.I.T., 1963–1966
 Associate Professor, Kyushu University, 1966–1970
 Associate Professor, Temple University, 1970–1972
 Professor, Temple University, 1972–1973
 Professor, Research Institute for Fundamental Physics, Kyoto University,
1973-1976
 Professor, Department of Physics, Kyushu University, 1976–2001
 Professor, Department of Physics, Chubu University, 2001–2007
 Electronics Research Laboratory, Fukuoka Institute of Technology, 2008-

Recognition
 Nishina Memorial Prize, 1972
 Humboldt Prize, 1992
 Boltzmann Medal, 2001
 Ulam Scholar, 2001-02

References 

1930 births
2021 deaths
Japanese physicists
Kyushu University alumni
Academic staff of Kyushu University
People from Ōtsu, Shiga